Route 411 or Highway 411 may refer to:

Canada
 Manitoba Provincial Road 411
 Newfoundland and Labrador Route 411

Costa Rica
 National Route 411

Israel
 Route 411 (Israel)

Japan
 Japan National Route 411

United States
  U.S. Route 411
  Georgia State Route 411 (unsigned designation for Interstate 185)
  Louisiana Highway 411
  Mississippi Highway 411
  New Mexico State Road 411
 New York:
  New York State Route 411
 County Route 411 (Albany County, New York)
  North Carolina Highway 411
  Puerto Rico Highway 411
  Washington State Route 411
 Washington State Route 411 Spur
  Wyoming Highway 411